Rapsodie nègre, FP 3, is a work dating from 1917 by Francis Poulenc for flute, clarinet, string quartet, baritone and piano. It was the composer's first work to be publicly performed.

The piece is in five movements, three of them purely instrumental; the central interlude is for baritone and piano, and the finale features all the performers. The dedicatee of the piece was Erik Satie.

History
By 1917 the 18-year-old Poulenc, who was then a pupil of Ricardo Viñes, had composed an unknown number of works. His biographer Carl Schmidt lists two earlier pieces known to have been destroyed by the composer, "Processional pour la crémation d'un mandarin" (1914) and Préludes (1916) both for solo piano. There was a fashion for African arts in Paris at the time, and Poulenc was delighted to run across some published verses, Les Poésies de Makoko Kangourou, supposedly edited  by Marcel Prouille and Charles Moulié; the verses were purportedly Liberian, but were a hoax, full of nonsense and  Parisian boulevard slang. The extract Poulenc chose to set for the vocal interlude and the finale read:
Honoloulou, pota lama!
Honoloulou, Honoloulou,
Kati moko, mosi bolou
Ratakou sira, polama!

Wata Kovsi mo ta ma sou
Etcha pango, Etche panga
tota nou nou, nou nou ranga
lo lo lulu ma ta ma sou.
 
Pata ta bo banana lou
mandes Golas Glebes ikrous
Banana lou ito kous kous
pota la ma Honoloulou.

The work was premiered on 11 December 1917, at one of a series of concerts of contemporary music organised by the singer Jeanne Bathori at the Théâtre du Vieux-Colombier. Poulenc later recalled the circumstances of the first performance:
At the last minute the singer threw in the towel, saying it was too stupid and that he didn't want to be taken for a fool. Quite unexpectedly, masked by a big music stand, I had to sing that interlude myself. Since I was already in uniform, you can imagine the unusual effect produced by a soldier bawling out songs in pseudo-Malagasy!

The Rapsodie was an immediate success, and was performed several times over the next few years at various venues in Paris. The work won the approval of established composers, including Erik Satie, to whom it is dedicated, Maurice Ravel, and Igor Stravinsky, who was impressed enough to arrange a contract for Poulenc with a leading music publisher.

Structure
The work, which plays for about ten or eleven minutes, is in  five sections:

Prélude – Modéré
A gently-paced opening, in  time, which leads into the second movement.

Ronde – Très vite
The critic James Harding describes it as "breathless … a sophisticated Parisian version of a tribal dance."

Honoloulou – Vocal Interlude – Lent et monotone
The winds and the string quartet do not play in this movement. It is in  time; the baritone, accompanied by the piano, sings the nonsense verse in "a monotonous descending figure that sticks maddeningly in the mind".

Pastorale – Modéré

Final – Presto et pas plus
The longest of the movements, in a hectic , interrupted by a brief reprise of the slow baritone solo from the Interlude.

Notes

References

Bibliography

External links

Compositions by Francis Poulenc
1917 compositions